William Anderson may refer to:

Arts and entertainment
 William Anderson (artist) (1757–1837), painter of marine and historical paintings
 William Anderson (theatre) (1868–1940), Australian stage entrepreneur
 William Anderson (1911–1986), American actor, better known as Leif Erickson
 Bill Anderson (producer) (1911–1997), American producer
 William West Anderson (1928–2017), known as Adam West, American actor, played Batman from 1966 to 1968 
 William M. Anderson (born 1948), film editor
 Wil Anderson (born 1974), Australian comedian
 Will Anderson (animator), Scottish film animator

Music
 W. H. Anderson (1882–1955), Canadian composer, choir director, singer, and voice teacher
 William K. Anderson, background music composer for My Little Pony: Friendship Is Magic
 Cat Anderson (William Alonzo Anderson, 1916–1981), American jazz trumpeter
 Bill Anderson (singer) (born 1937), American country music singer, songwriter, and game show host
 William Anderson (guitarist) (born 1962), American classical guitarist and composer
 Will Anderson (singer) (born 1986), lead vocalist in the band Parachute

Writing
 William Anderson (bookseller) (1743–1830), bookseller and five times Provost of Stirling
 William Anderson (Scottish writer) (1805–1866), Scottish writer, poet, editor and author of The Scottish Nation
 William J. Anderson (1811–?), American slave and author
 William Charles Anderson (1920–2003), American author
 William Anderson (American writer) (born 1952), American biographer, specializing on Laura Ingalls Wilder

Law and politics

Australia
 William Anderson (Victorian politician, born 1828) (1828–1909), Scottish-born Victorian colonial politician, member for Villiers and Heytesbury
 William Anderson (Victorian politician, born 1853) (1853–1898), Victorian colonial politician for Creswick, and Windermere
 William Anderson (Tasmanian politician) (1904–1990), Australian politician from Tasmania
 William Acland Douglas Anderson (1829–1882), English-born politician and goldfields commissioner in colonial Victoria, Australia

Canada
 William Stafford Anderson (1884–1980), politician in New Brunswick, Canada
 William Anderson (Ontario MPP) (1822–1897), Canadian politician
 William Anderson (Ontario MP) (1905–1961), member of Canadian House of Commons for Waterloo South electoral district

U.S.
 William Anderson (Pennsylvania politician) (1762–1829), U.S. Congressman from Pennsylvania
 William Marshall Anderson (1807–1881), American scholar, explorer and politician
 William Clayton Anderson (1826–1861), U.S. Representative from Kentucky
 William B. Anderson (1830–1901), U.S. Representative from Illinois
 William Alexander Anderson (1842–1930), Virginia lawyer and politician
 William Coleman Anderson (1853–1902), U.S. Representative from Tennessee
 William Dozier Anderson (1862–1952), Mississippi Supreme Court Justice
 William Gilbert Anderson (1860–1947), American pioneer of physical education
 William A. Anderson (1873–1954), mayor of Minneapolis, Minnesota
 William Hamilton Anderson (1874–c. 1959), superintendent of the New York Anti-Saloon League
 William Anderson (naval officer) (1921–2007), U.S. Representative from Tennessee
 Bill Anderson (West Virginia politician) (born 1948), member of the West Virginia House of Delegates
 Bill Anderson (Iowa politician) (born 1977), Republican politician and legislator from the state of Iowa
 Bill Anderson (Ohio politician), former member of the Ohio House of Representatives

Elsewhere
 William Spencer Anderson (c. 1832–1872), American-born Liberian politician and explorer
 William Anderson (British politician) (1877–1919), British socialist politician
 William Anderson (New Zealand politician) (1888–1978), mayor of Queenstown, New Zealand

Medicine
 William Anderson (collector) (1842–1900), British surgeon and collector of Japanese art who first described Anderson-Fabry disease
 William G. Anderson (born 1927), American physician and social activist
 William Wallace Anderson, medical doctor involved in architecture of rammed earth construction in South Carolina

Military
 William Anderson (1820–1848), British Army lieutenant with the 1st Bombay Fusiliers whose murder affected the Second Anglo-Sikh War
 William T. Anderson (1840–1864), American Civil War guerrilla commander, known as "Bloody Bill"
 William Anderson (Medal of Honor) (1852–1908), American sailor and Medal of Honor recipient
 William Herbert Anderson (1881–1918), Scottish recipient of the Victoria Cross
 William Anderson (VC) (1885–1915), Scottish recipient of the Victoria Cross
 William Anderson (RAAF officer) (1891–1975), Australian air marshal
 Maurice Anderson (1908–1986), often known as Bill Anderson, British Army medical officer
 William Anderson (Canadian Army officer) (1915–2000), Canadian general
 William Anderson (naval officer) (1921–2007), commander of the first nuclear submarine
 William Y. Anderson (1921–2011), Swedish American fighter ace of World War II
 William C. Anderson (Air Force) (born 1958), Assistant Secretary of the Air Force, 2005–2008
 William Lovett Anderson (1906–2004), United States Navy submarine commander

Religion
 William Anderson (died 1543), one of the Perth Martyrs
 William Anderson (missionary) (1769–1852), English-Anglican missionary to South Africa
 William Anderson (minister) (1799–1873), Scottish theological writer and preacher
 William F. Anderson (bishop) (1860–1944), American Methodist bishop
 William Harrison Anderson (1870–1950), American Seventh-Day Adventist missionary to Africa
 William Anderson (bishop of Salisbury) (1892–1972), Anglican Bishop of Croydon, of Portsmouth and of Salisbury, England
 William Anderson (bishop of Caledonia) (born 1950), Canadian Anglican bishop since 2001
 William White Anderson (1888–1956), Scottish minister who served as Moderator of the General Assembly of the Church of Scotland

Science
 William Anderson (naturalist) (1750–1778), naturalist on Captain Cook's third voyage (1776–1780)
 William Anderson (horticulturist) (1766–1846), Scottish horticulturist
 William James Anderson (1812–1873), Scottish physician who emigrated to Canada
 William Anderson (engineer) (1835–1898), British engineer and philanthropist
 William Henry Anderson (1908–1997), American entomologist
 William French Anderson (born 1936), American geneticist and molecular biologist

Sports

Baseball
 Bill Anderson (1880s pitcher) (1865–1936), American Major League Baseball player
 Bill Anderson (1920s pitcher) (1895–1983), American Major League Baseball player
 Bill Anderson (1940s pitcher) (1913–?), American Negro league baseball player
 Bill Anderson (outfielder), American Negro league baseball player

Cricket
 William Anderson (cricket umpire) (1910–1975), South African Test match umpire in two games
 William Anderson (cricketer, born 1859) (1859–1943), French Olympic silver medal-winning cricketer
 William Anderson (cricketer, born 1871) (1871–1948), English cricketer
 William Anderson (cricketer, born 1880) (1880–1958), English cricketer and British Indian Army officer
 William Anderson (cricketer, born 1909) (1909–1975), English cricketer
 William Anderson (Scottish cricketer) (1894–1973), Scottish cricketer from Fife

Football
 Bill Anderson (American football, born 1921) (1921–1984), American football end
 Bill Anderson (American football, born 1925) (1925–2013), head football coach at Howard Payne University
 Bill Anderson (American football, born 1936) (1936–2017), American football tight end
 Bill Anderson (American football, born 1947), head football coach at North Park University and Illinois College
 Billy Anderson (quarterback) (1941–1996), led NCAA in passing in 1965
 Bill Anderson (footballer, born 1878) (1878–1915), Australian rules footballer for St Kilda
 Bill Anderson (footballer, born 1911) (1911–1971), Australian rules footballer for Geelong
 Bill Anderson (English footballer) (1913–1986), manager of Football League side Lincoln City, 1946–1965
 Will Anderson (fullback) (1897–1982), American football player
 Will Anderson Jr. (born 2001), American football player
 William Anderson (Scottish footballer) (c. 1860–?), Scottish footballer
 Willie Anderson (footballer) (born 1947), English footballer for Aston Villa, Cardiff City
 Tim Anderson (defensive back) (William Tim Anderson, born 1949), American football defensive back

Other sports
 Red Anderson (ice hockey) (Bill Anderson, 1910–1991), Canadian ice hockey player
 William Anderson (rugby union) (died 1892), New Zealand rugby union player  
 William Anderson (ice hockey) (1901–1983), British ice hockey player who competed in the 1924 Winter Olympics
 Bill Anderson (strongman) (born 1937), Scottish sportsman
 William Anderson (cyclist) (1888–1928), Canadian Olympic cyclist
 Bill Anderson (coach) (1891–1969), American football, basketball, and baseball coach
 William Anderson (athlete) (died 1915), Irish athlete

Other uses
 Chief William Anderson, namesake of Anderson, Indiana
 William Caldwell Anderson (1804–1870), president of Miami University
 William Anderson (judge) (1847–1908), British barrister and colonial judge
 William P. Anderson (1851–1927), Canadian civil engineer
 W. B. Anderson (1877–1959), Scottish classicist and academic
 William Anderson (political scientist) (1888–1975), professor at University of Minnesota
 William S. Anderson (1919–2021), president and chairman of the National Cash Register Corp, 1972–1984
 William M. Anderson Jr. (born 1942), American academic and education administrator
 Eric Anderson (teacher) (William Kinloch Anderson, 1936–2020), Provost of Eton College, 2000–2009
 Will Anderson (Scrabble player) (born 1984), American Scrabble player

See also
 Bill Andersen (politician) (born 1936), 1988 Republican candidate from Tennessee for the U.S. Senate
 Bill Andersen (1924–2005), New Zealand communist and trade union leader
 Billy Anderson (disambiguation)
 Willie Anderson (disambiguation)